The Football Association of Selangor, also known as FAS is the governing body of football for the state of Selangor, Malaysia. They are responsible for growing the standards of grassroots football in the state as they seek to create a long-lasting impact on the state's football ecosystem.

Administration

The FAS' mission is to become a leader in governing football in Selangor including grassroots, community football, social football, amateur and semi-pro football while their vision is to unite the football community in Selangor and producing ‘’Champions” among players, football clubs, referees, coaches and others along with forming a sustainable football ecosystem.

Football Association of Selangor aims to establish safe and structured football opportunities for the benefit of all concerned irrespective of age, colour, gender and ability. The FAS provide the appropriate structures and systems to enable the association to manage, regulate and promote the game of football within the state. This also enables them to assist with the development of the game at all levels, ensuring they are able to increase the quality and levels of participation across a broad spectrum of players, officials, parents, referees, coaches and supporters in the state of Selangor. They also help in developing football in school, women's football and the development of amateur football clubs in the state of Selangor as well as looking to develop individuals to lead the football industry.

The FAS, under the leadership of President Tengku Amir Shah, have come up with five pillars to focus on as a guide to transforming the state's grassroots football scene across all ages and genders. Those five pillars are:

 Commercial strength of FA Selangor's leagues
 Youth & Junior Football Development (7-21 years old)
 Coach Education & Referee Development
 Championing Girls' & Women's Football
 Education & Sports Scholarship

Official

Executive committee 

Source:

Former presidents 

Source:

Competitions
The Football Association of Selangor ran and organized the following competitions for the amateur clubs:

 FAS Super League
 FAS Premier League
 FAS Division 1 League
 FAS FA Cup
 FAS Charity Shield Cup

Affiliated

District Football Association
District Football Association is the governing body of football for the district in Selangor. The district FAs are responsible for coordinating the district football team and developing football in their district and also made up the structure of FAS as the official governing body of football in the state of Selangor

There are 9 Football Associations affiliated to the FAS.

 Gombak FA 
 Klang FA 
 Sepang FA 
 Petaling FA 
 Kuala Selangor FA 
 Hulu Selangor FA 
 Kuala Langat FA 
 Hulu Langat FA 
 Sabak Bernam FA

Affiliated leagues

Men's Football Leagues
Klang Valley League Shah Alam
Klang Valley League UM Park
Klang Valley League Cyberjaya
Klang Valley League City Centre
Klang Valley League Gombak
Kota Damansara Premier League
Puchong Community League
Setia Alam Football League
Selangor Social Premier League
DACS Social League
The District Social League
Frenzz League
Futbola Social League
Klang League
Isma Community League
Shah Alam Social League
RF Social League
Ryders Super League
Selangor Varsity Social League
South Selangor League
Sportster Premier League
Sunarize Social League 
Sungai Buloh Community League
The Pit League
Prestige Cup
Setia Alam Cup

Ladies and Girls Leagues

Youth Leagues

Small Sided Leagues

Affiliated clubs

Top clubs in the top 3-tiers league competition that affiliated to the Football Association of Selangor include:
 Selangor F.C.

Among others clubs that are affiliated to the Football Association of Selangor include:

 Anak Kalumpang F.C.
 AU2 F.C.
 Bayu Tinggi F.C.
 Bukit Rotan Baru F.C.
 Cenderawasih F.C.
 Gen-Professional F.C.
 Hong Chin F.C.
 MAS F.C.
 Malaysia Airports F.C.
 MMU F.C.
 My World F.C.
 Medan Harmoni F.C.
 Port Rangers F.C.
 Putra Perwira F.C.
 Sari Dee F.C.
 Taman Putra Damai F.C.
 Tunas Lagenda F.C.
 Turi F.C.
 Tanjung Football Sport Club
 Tanjung Karang F.C.
 Teleflow F.C.
 TPCA Sport Club
 UiTM Football Sport Club

See also

 Selangor F.C.
 Malaysia Super League
 Malaysia Premier League
 Malaysia Cup
 Malaysia FA Cup
 Sultan of Selangor Cup
 History of Malaysian Football

References

External links
Official website of Football Association Of Selangor

1936 establishments in British Malaya
Football associations in Malaysia
Shah Alam
Petaling Jaya
Sports organizations established in 1936
Selangor FA